Qul Ali (also Romanized as Qūl ‘Alī and Qowl ‘Alī; also known as Gholali, Gol‘alī, Kulālu, and Qol‘alī) is a village in Karasf Rural District, in the Central District of Khodabandeh County, Zanjan Province, Iran. At the 2006 census, its population was 324, in 77 families.

References 

Populated places in Khodabandeh County